Colin P. McKinney (May 23, 1873 – March 30, 1944) was a justice of the Tennessee Supreme Court from 1918 to 1942.

Born in Ripley, Tennessee, McKinney attended the public schools and Brennan Military Academy. Intending to become a court reporter, he read law with his uncle, Judge Blair Pierson, and gained admission to the bar in Tennessee in 1896. He became a chancellor of the Ninth Division of Tennessee in 1910, and after eight years in that office was elected to the newly reconstituted state supreme court.

McKinney retired from the bench in 1942, due to ill health, and died in Nashville two years later, at the age of 70.

References

1873 births
1944 deaths
People from Ripley, Tennessee
U.S. state supreme court judges admitted to the practice of law by reading law
Justices of the Tennessee Supreme Court